The Fairfax Apartments is an historic apartment building in the North Oakland neighborhood of Pittsburgh, Pennsylvania. Built between 1926 and 1927 as the Fifth Avenue Apartments, it was renamed in 1928 after being sold to the Fairfax Hotel Company.

The building was listed on the National Register of Historic Places in 2021.

History and architectural features
The building is nine stories high and consists of a main block facing Fifth Avenue with two perpendicular rear wings. It is faced with brown brick with limestone Jacobethan Revival architectural details including spandrels, quoins, and stringcourses.

The symmetrical front elevation is fifteen bays wide with three slightly projecting sections which are topped with stone finials. The side and rear elevations are less ornamented.

The building contains twenty-seven studio and one-bedroom apartments on each floor, except for the ground floor, which mostly serves as office space.

References

Residential buildings on the National Register of Historic Places in Pennsylvania
Residential buildings completed in 1927
Apartment buildings in Pittsburgh
National Register of Historic Places in Pittsburgh
1927 establishments in Pennsylvania